Jiye may refer to:
Jieh, a town in Lebanon
Jiye people, an ethnic group in Sudan